Karrösten is a municipality and a village in the district of Imst, located 1.3 km east of Imst. The village was founded because of mining in the 16th century. Fruits and maize as well as sweet chestnuts flourish on the slopes.

Population

References

External links

Lechtal Alps
Mieming Range
Cities and towns in Imst District